Tarek Mohamed Soliman (born 24 January 1962) is a retired Egyptian footballer. He played as a midfielder for Al-Masry and the Egyptian national team.

Soliman made several appearances for the Egypt national football team, including participating in the African Cup of Nations in 1988 and 1992. He also played in the 1990 FIFA World Cup finals.

Honours 
National Team
 The second place in the Arab Cup Of Nations for Egypt 1988.

Al-Masry
 The third place in the Egyptian League 1983–84.
 The second place in the Egyptian Soccer Cup 1982–83, 1983–84, 1988–89

References

External links

1962 births
Living people
Egyptian footballers
Egypt international footballers
Egyptian Premier League players
Al Masry SC players
1990 FIFA World Cup players
1988 African Cup of Nations players
1992 African Cup of Nations players
Sportspeople from Port Said
Association football midfielders